The Robichaux House is a historic house located at 322 East 2nd Street in Thibodaux, Louisiana.

Built in 1898, the house is a two-story frame residence in Queen Anne Revival style with Eastlake gallery details, three polygonal bays and two chimneys. The roof features a square turret with two oculi.

The style of the building reflects the "second wave of prosperity" in Thibodaux, where houses were first designed in the Greek Revival style.

The house was listed on the National Register of Historic Places on March 5, 1986.

It is one of 14 individually NRHP-listed properties in the "Thibodaux Multiple Resource Area", which also includes:
Bank of Lafourche Building
Breaux House
Building at 108 Green Street
Chanticleer Gift Shop
Citizens Bank of Lafourche
Grand Theatre
Lamartina Building
McCulla House
Peltier House
Percy-Lobdell Building
Riviere Building
Riviere House

St. Joseph Co-Cathedral and Rectory

References

Houses on the National Register of Historic Places in Louisiana
Queen Anne architecture in Louisiana
Houses completed in 1898
Lafourche Parish, Louisiana
National Register of Historic Places in Lafourche Parish, Louisiana